Sharovipteryx ("Sharov's wing", known until 1981 as Podopteryx, "foot wing"), is a genus of early gliding reptiles containing the single species Sharovipteryx mirabilis. It is known from a single fossil and is the only glider with a membrane surrounding the pelvis instead of the pectoral girdle. This lizard-like reptile was found in 1965 in the Madygen Formation, Dzailauchou, on the southwest edge of the Fergana Valley in Kyrgyzstan, in what was then the Asian part of the U.S.S.R. dating to the middle-late Triassic period (about 225 million years ago).  The Madygen horizon displays flora that put it in the Upper Triassic. An unusual reptile, Longisquama, was also found there.

S. mirabilis is known from a unique holotype specimen, which was first described by Aleksandr Grigorevich Sharov in 1971. Sharov named the species Podopteryx mirabilis, "foot wing", for the wing membranes on the hind limbs. However, that name had previously been used for a genus of damselfly, Podopteryx, so in 1981 Richard Cowen created the new genus name Sharovipteryx for the species.

Description

The skeleton is preserved in dorsal view and largely complete, with the bones still articulated and impressions of some of the integument. But part of the pectoral girdle is missing and part is still encased in stone.

In 1987, Gans et al. published a revised description: they found that the patagium did not extend to the forelimbs. Their experiments with models showed that the reptile could glide with its uropatagium and stabilize its glide by changing the angles of its forelimbs to provide an aeronautic canard or by bending its tail up or down to produce drag.In 2006, Dyke et al. published a study on possible gliding techniques for Sharovipteryx. The authors found that the wing membrane, which stretched between its very long hind legs and tail, would have allowed it to glide as a delta wing aircraft does. If the tiny front limbs also supported a membrane, they could have acted as a very efficient means of controlling pitch stability, very much like an aeronautic canard. Without a forewing, the authors find, controlled gliding would have been very difficult. Together with the canards on the forelimbs, these anterior membranes may have formed excellent control surfaces for gliding. The area around the forelimbs was completely prepared away in the only known fossil, destroying any possible trace of a membrane there.

Classification
 
Sharovipteryx is generally agreed to belong to a group of early archosaur relatives known as the protorosaurs (or prolacertiformes). A possible close relative of Sharovipteryx, Ozimek volans was recovered as a member of the family Tanystropheidae in the phylogenetic analysis conducted by Pritchard & Sues (2019); Sharovipteryx itself was not included in this analysis, but the authors considered it possible that both Ozimek and Sharovipteryx were nested within Tanystropheidae.

See also

 Coelurosauravus
 Draco volans

References

External links 
 First Delta-Wing Fighter Was a Reptile – LiveScience.com
 JPG of the fossil from the Russian paleontological museum – Paleo.ru
 Photograph of the type specimen, from the twitter account of Nickolay Gnezdilov
 Photograph of the type specimen, from the twitter account of Christian Kammerer

Prehistoric archosauromorphs
Prehistoric reptile genera
Carnian genera
Middle Triassic reptiles of Asia
Gliding animals
Fossils of Kyrgyzstan
Madygen Formation
Fossil taxa described in 1971